Parmouti 24 - Coptic Calendar - Parmouti 26

The twenty-fifth day of the Coptic month of Parmouti, the eighth month of the Coptic year. In common years, this day corresponds to April 20, of the Julian Calendar, and May 3, of the Gregorian Calendar. This day falls in the Coptic Season of Shemu, the season of the Harvest.

Commemorations

Martyrs 

 The martyrdom of Saint Sarah and her two sons 

 The martyrdom of Saint Theodore the Hermit, and the 124 Martyrs

References 

Days of the Coptic calendar